Kevin Andrew Ginkel (born March 24, 1994) is an American professional baseball pitcher for the Arizona Diamondbacks of Major League Baseball (MLB). He made his MLB debut in 2019.

Career

Amateur career
Ginkel attended El Capitan High School in Lakeside, California and played college baseball at Southwestern College and the University of Arizona. He was drafted by the San Francisco Giants in the 16th round of the 2014 Major League Baseball draft and the Boston Red Sox in the 26th round of the 2015 MLB draft, but did not sign either time and returned to school. In 2015, he played collegiate summer baseball with the Cotuit Kettleers of the Cape Cod Baseball League. He signed with the Arizona Diamondbacks after being drafted by them in the 22nd round of the 2016 MLB draft.

Professional career
Ginkel made his professional debut with the Hillsboro Hops where he went 1–0 with a 2.61 ERA in 18 relief appearances. He played 2017 with HIllsboro and the Kane County Cougars, pitching to a combined 1–2 record and a 5.36 ERA in 40.1 relief innings, and 2018 with the Visalia Rawhide and Jackson Generals, going 6–1 with a 1.41 ERA in 54 appearances in relief. After the 2018 season, he played in the Arizona Fall League. He split the 2019 minor league season between the AZL Diamondbacks, Jackson, and the Reno Aces, and went a combined 2–2 with a 1.78 ERA over 34 innings..

On August 5, 2019, the Diamondbacks selected Ginkel's contract and promoted him to the major leagues. He made his debut that night versus the Philadelphia Phillies, pitching  of an inning and striking out one batter (J. T. Realmuto). Ginkel finished the 2019 season going 3–0 with a 1.48 ERA in  innings. In 2020, Ginkel recorded a 6.75 ERA with 18 strikeouts and 13 walks in 16.0 innings of work. Ginkel made 32 appearances for Arizona the following season, but struggled to a 6.35 ERA in 28.1 innings of work. He was outrighted off of the 40-man roster following the season on November 19, 2021. He had his contract selected on August 1, 2022.

References

External links

Arizona Wildcats bio

1994 births
Living people
Baseball players from San Diego
Major League Baseball pitchers
Arizona Diamondbacks players
Southwestern Jaguars baseball players
Arizona Wildcats baseball players
Cotuit Kettleers players
Arizona League Diamondbacks players
Hillsboro Hops players
Kane County Cougars players
Visalia Rawhide players
Jackson Generals (Southern League) players
Salt River Rafters players
Reno Aces players